On July 20, 2012, a mass shooting occurred inside a Century 16 movie theater in Aurora, Colorado, United States, during a midnight screening of the film The Dark Knight Rises. Dressed in tactical clothing, 24-year-old James Holmes set off tear gas grenades and shot into the audience with multiple firearms. Twelve people were killed and 70 others were injured, 58 of them from gunfire. 

It is the deadliest shooting by a lone perpetrator in the history of Colorado and the state's second deadliest mass shooting, just after the 1999 Columbine High School massacre. At the time, the event had the largest number of victims (82) in one shooting in modern U.S. history. This number was later surpassed by the 107 victims of the 2016 Orlando nightclub shooting and eventually the 927 victims of the 2017 Las Vegas shooting.

Holmes was arrested minutes later in his car outside the cinema. Earlier, he had rigged his apartment with homemade explosives and incendiary devices. These were defused by the Arapahoe County Sheriff's Office Bomb Squad a day after the shooting.

Fearing copycat crimes, movie theaters showing the same film across the US increased their security. Gun sales increased in Colorado, and political debates were generated about gun control in the United States.

Holmes confessed to the shooting but pleaded not guilty by reason of insanity. Arapahoe County prosecutors sought the death penalty. The trial began on April 27, 2015. On July 16 of that year, Holmes was convicted of 24 counts of first-degree murder, 140 counts of attempted first-degree murder, and one count of possessing explosives. On August 7, the jury deadlocked on whether to impose the death penalty. On August 26, Holmes was given 12 life sentences, one for every person he killed; he also received 3,318 years for the attempted murders of those he wounded and for rigging his apartment with explosives.

Events

Shooting
The shooting occurred in Theater 9 at the Century 16 multiplex (operated by Cinemark Theatres), located in the Town Center at Aurora shopping mall at 14300 E. Alameda Avenue. Police said that Holmes bought a ticket, entered the theater, and sat in the front row. About 20 minutes into the film, he left theater 9 through an emergency exit door beside the movie screen, with direct access to the lightly used parking area at the back of the complex, while propping the door slightly open with a plastic tablecloth holder. There were about 400 people inside theater 9.

Holmes went to his car (which he had parked near the exit door), changed into protective clothing, and retrieved his guns. About 30 minutes into the movie, police say, around 12:30 a.m., he reentered the theater through the exit door. Holmes was dressed in black and wore a gas mask, a load-bearing vest, a ballistic helmet, bullet-resistant leggings, a bullet-resistant throat protector, a groin protector, and tactical gloves. He was listening to techno music through a set of headphones so that he could not hear anything from people in the theater. Initially, few in the audience considered Holmes to be a threat. Some witnesses thought he was wearing a costume, like other audience members who had dressed up for the screening. Some believed he was playing a prank, while others thought he was part of a special effects setup for the film's premiere, or a publicity stunt by the studio or theater management.

Holmes reportedly threw one canister towards the left side of the theatre, emitting a gas or smoke, that partially obscured the audience members' vision, made their throats and skin itch, and caused eye irritation. He fired a 12-gauge Remington 870 Express Tactical shotgun, first at the ceiling and then at the audience. He also fired a Smith & Wesson M&P15 semi-automatic rifle with a 100-round drum magazine, which eventually malfunctioned. Finally, he fired a .40-caliber Glock 22 Gen4 handgun. He shot first to the back of the room, and then toward people in the aisles. A bullet passed through the wall and hit three people in adjacent theater 8, which was screening the same film. Witnesses said the multiplex's fire alarm system began sounding soon after the attack began, and staff told people in Theater 8 to evacuate.

Holmes fired 76 shots in the theater: six from the shotgun, 65 from the semi-automatic rifle, and five from the .40-caliber handgun.

Police response
The first phone calls to emergency services via 9-1-1 were made at 12:39 a.m. Police arrived within 90 seconds and found three .40-caliber handgun magazines, a shotgun, and a large drum magazine on the floor of the theater. Some people reported the shooting via Twitter or text messaging rather than calling the police; officers were already at the theater by the time that the tweets were sent. Ambulances were hindered by chaos and congestion in the parking lot, and they were unable to reach the back of the complex where police had pulled the injured out through the emergency exit doors of Theatre 9. Sgt. Stephen Redfearn, one of the first police officers to arrive on the scene, sent victims to area hospitals in squad cars.

At about 12:45 a.m., police officer Jason Oviatt apprehended Holmes behind the cinema, next to his car, without resistance. Because of his tactical clothing, Holmes was at first mistaken for another police officer. He was described as being calm and "disconnected" during his arrest. Two federal officials said that Holmes had dyed his hair red and called himself "The Joker", although authorities later declined to confirm this. Three days later, at his first court appearance in Centennial, Colorado, Holmes's hair appeared reddish-orange. Later, the Colorado district attorney who prosecuted Holmes said he never called himself The Joker, and blamed the federal officials for the rumor. The officers found several firearms in the theater and inside the shooter's car, including another Glock 22 handgun. Holmes was found carrying a first aid kit and spike strips, which he later admitted in an interview he had planned to use if police either shot at or chased him.

Following his arrest, Holmes was initially jailed at the Arapahoe County Detention Center, under suicide watch. The police interviewed more than 200 witnesses of the shooting.  Speaking on behalf of himself and FBI agent James Yacone, who was in charge of the investigation, Aurora Police Chief Dan Oates said he was confident that the shooter acted alone.

Discovery of explosive devices

When apprehended, Holmes told the police that he had booby-trapped his apartment with explosive devices. Holmes' apartment complex is limited to University of Colorado Medical Center students, patients, and employees. One day after the shooting, officials disarmed an explosive device that was wired to the apartment's front door, allowing a remote-controlled robot to enter and disable other explosives. The apartment held more than 30 homemade grenades, wired to a control box in the kitchen and filled with at least  of gasoline.

Neighbors reported loud music from the apartment around midnight on the night of the massacre, and one went to his door to tell him she was calling the police; she said the door seemed to be unlocked, but she chose not to open it.

A police official said a Batman mask was found in the apartment. On July 23, police finished collecting evidence from the apartment. Two days later, residents were allowed to return to the four surrounding buildings, and six days later, residents were allowed to move back into the formerly booby-trapped building.

Casualties
Twelve fatalities were reported along with 70 injuries. Seventy were hit by bullets, and were reported by mainstream news as the most victims of any mass shooting in United States history. This figure would not be surpassed until the 2016 Orlando nightclub shooting, which killed 49 people and injured 58 others for a combined total of 107 casualties. Four people's eyes were irritated by the tear gas grenades, while eight others sustained non-gunshot injuries while fleeing the theater. The massacre was the deadliest shooting in Colorado since the Columbine High School massacre on April 20, 1999.

Fatalities
Ten victims died at the scene and two more were pronounced dead in local hospitals. Five men  Jonathan Blunk, John Larimer, Matt McQuinn, Jesse Childress, and Alexander C. Teves  died protecting their girlfriends or friends. The people murdered were:

 Jonathan Blunk, 26
 Alexander J. Boik, 18
 Jesse Childress, 29

 Gordon Cowden, 51
 Jessica Ghawi (aka Jessica Redfield), 24
 John Larimer, 27

 Matt McQuinn, 27
 Micayla Medek, 23
 Veronica Moser-Sullivan, 6

 Alex Sullivan, 27
 Alexander C. Teves, 24
 Rebecca Wingo, 32

Ghawi had survived the Eaton Centre shooting in Toronto that occurred a month prior.

Injuries
The injured were treated at Children's Hospital Colorado, Denver Health Medical Center, The Medical Center of Aurora, Parker Adventist Hospital, Rose Medical Center, Swedish Hospital, and University Hospital. On July 25, three of the five hospitals treating victims announced they would limit medical bills or forgive them entirely.

Ashley Moser, Veronica Moser-Sullivan's mother, suffered critical injuries after being shot in the chest. She was rendered a paraplegic. She miscarried a week after the attack.

Caleb Medley, the last victim discharged, left University Hospital on September 12. He had serious brain damage and an injury to his right eye from a shotgun blast to the head, and underwent three brain surgeries. He required a feeding tube, had severely impaired movement, and could no longer speak.

The Community First Foundation collected more than $5 million for a fund for victims and their families. In September, victims and their families received surveys asking about their preferences for how collected funds should be distributed, either by dividing it equally among victims or through a needs-assessment process.

On November 16, 2012, the Aurora Victim Relief Fund announced that each family of the dead would receive $220,000.

Court proceedings

Holmes' booking photo was released and he first appeared in court on July 23, 2012. According to press reports, he seemed dazed and largely unaware of his surroundings.

On July 30, Colorado prosecutors filed formal charges against Holmes, including 24 counts of first-degree murder, 116 counts of attempted first-degree murder and one count of illegal possession of explosives. Two charges were filed for each victim to expand the opportunities for prosecutors to obtain convictions. Colorado State District Court Judge William B. Sylvester, who was the trial judge overseeing the case, placed a gag order on lawyers and law enforcement, sealing the court file and barring the University of Colorado from releasing public records relating to Holmes' year at the school. Media organizations challenged the sealing of the court file.

On August 9, Holmes' attorneys said he is mentally ill and they needed more time to assess the nature of his illness. The disclosure was made at a court hearing in Centennial, Colorado, where news media organizations asked a judge to unseal court documents in the case. Prosecutors alleged on August 24, 2012, that Holmes told a classmate he wanted to kill people four months before the shooting.

A judge ruled on August 30 that a notebook written by Holmes, in which he allegedly described a violent attack, was covered by physician–patient privilege because it was addressed to his psychiatrist. This made it inadmissible as evidence unless Holmes' mental health became an issue in the case. Prosecutors dropped their request for access to the notebook on September 20, 2012. Due to suicide attempts made by Holmes, Judge Sylvester agreed to postpone proceedings until December 2012.

On January 2, 2013, prosecutors and defense attorneys in the case returned to court in advance of the preliminary hearing, the public's first officially sanctioned look at the evidence, due to the gag order. It began on January 7. Prosecutors offered their case as to why the trial should proceed, and defense lawyers argued that it should not. At the conclusion, Judge Sylvester decided there was enough relevant, admissible evidence to proceed to a trial.

Also on January 7, lawyers for both sides argued whether to admit four unspecified prescription bottles and immunization records investigators had seized from Holmes' apartment when they searched it in July 2012, considering doctor-patient confidentiality laws. The judge ruled in October that prosecutors could keep the items.

On March 27, Holmes' lawyers offered a guilty plea in exchange for prosecutors not seeking the death penalty. On April 1, the prosecution announced it had declined the offer. Arapahoe County district attorney George Brauchler said: "It's my determination and my intention that in this case for James Eagan Holmes justice is death."

Jury selection started on January 20, 2015. It ended on April 15, 2015.

Trial

The trial started on April 27, 2015. The jury consisted of 19 women and five men, two of whom had connections to the Columbine High School massacre. Arapahoe County prosecutors said that Holmes was sane during the shooting and intended to kill all 400 people in the theater, while Holmes' lawyers said he had a psychotic episode during the attack.

On May 7, an FBI agent displayed pieces of evidence at the trial, including Holmes' body armor, an arsenal of weapons, unfired ammunition, and a helmet with strands of his dyed orange hair. Jurors examined the evidence for thirty minutes. Holmes was represented by the Colorado State Public Defender.

On May 26, details of Holmes' notebook, reportedly found in a university mail room addressed to his psychiatrist Lynne Fenton, were entered into evidence at the trial for the first time. The notebook elaborated on Holmes' obsession to kill since ten years prior to the shooting,  his dissatisfaction with life and finding work, as well as health issues. It also had details of his planning for the shooting, which prosecutors said indicated Holmes premeditated the attack. On May 27, Dr. William Reid, a court-appointed psychiatrist, testified that Holmes was mentally ill but legally sane. Reid and another doctor evaluated Holmes in December 2013 and determined that he understood what he was doing. On June 8, a second psychiatrist, Jeffrey Metzner, testified that Holmes was mentally ill but legally sane during the shooting, and suffers from schizoaffective disorder.

On June 9, three jurors were dismissed from the trial due to concerns of their violating orders not to talk about news reports about the case. In the following week, two additional jurors were dismissed; the first due to emotional problems following the shooting of a family member, the second for recognizing a survivor who was wounded in the massacre.

On July 9, Judge Carlos Samour asked Holmes if he would testify in court, and advised him of his rights to do so. Holmes chose not to testify.

By July 10, the prosecution and the defense rested their cases. Closing statements were made on July 14, with formal deliberations beginning the following morning.

Verdict and sentencing

On July 16, after jury deliberations, Holmes was found guilty of 24 counts of first-degree murder, 140 counts of attempted first-degree murder, one count of possessing illegal explosives, and a sentence enhancement of a crime of violence. The two murder convictions for each death were first-degree murder or attempted murder after deliberation, and first-degree murder or attempted murder with extreme indifference.

The sentencing phase began on July 22. On July 23, the jury ruled that Holmes acted in a cruel manner, was lying in wait, and ambushed his victims during the shooting, which constitute as aggravating factors. However, the jurors decided that Holmes did not intend to kill children when he opened fire.

On July 27, Holmes' sister stated in her testimony that her brother became withdrawn from the family after they moved from Salinas to San Diego during his early teenage years. On July 28, Holmes' father pleaded for his son's life, stating that he is severely mentally ill. He displayed photos of camping trips and family vacations with Holmes to the jury. On July 30, Holmes' lawyers made a final appeal to the jurors, urging them to consider mental illness in his sentencing despite their rejection of the insanity defense used in the trial. The appeal for clemency was rejected on August 3 under the basis that mitigating factors such as mental illness did not outweigh aggravating factors such as the number of casualties in the massacre.

Holmes was sentenced to life in prison without the possibility of parole on August 7 after jurors failed to reach a unanimous decision over sentencing him to death. Formal sentencing began on August 24 and was expected to last for three days. At the end of the hearing on August 26, Samour formally sentenced Holmes to 12 life imprisonment sentences without parole and a maximum of 3,318 additional years on attempted murder and explosives possession convictions.

Reactions

Government

The evening after the shooting, a candlelight vigil was held at the site in Aurora. President Barack Obama ordered flags at government buildings flown at half-staff, in tribute to the victims, until July 25. Both Obama's and Mitt Romney's campaigns temporarily suspended television advertising in Colorado for the 2012 presidential election. On July 22, President Obama met with victims and local and state officials and gave a nationally televised speech from Aurora. Many world leaders sent their condolences, including Queen Elizabeth II, French President François Hollande, Israeli Prime Minister Benjamin Netanyahu, Russian President Vladimir Putin, and Pope Benedict XVI.

Entertainment industry

Warner Bros., the distributor of The Dark Knight Rises, said it was deeply saddened by the shooting. The studio canceled the film's gala premieres in France, Mexico, and Japan, scaled down its marketing campaign in Finland, and decided not to report box office figures for the movie until July 23. Some television advertisements for the film were also canceled. Other major film studios joined Warner Bros. in withholding early box office numbers on July 21. Warner Bros. reportedly made a "substantial" donation to Colorado's Community First Foundation to benefit victims.

Christopher Nolan, the film's director, spoke on behalf of his cast and crew and called the event "savage" and "devastating". Christian Bale, who plays Batman in the film series, privately visited victims on July 24. Members of the Colorado Rockies baseball team also visited victims. Members of the Denver Broncos also called or visited individuals at the hospitals.

Warner Bros. instructed cinemas to stop screening a trailer for the film Gangster Squad, which preceded The Dark Knight Rises screenings in some cities (though not in Aurora), because it contained a scene involving the main characters shooting at a movie theater audience with machine guns. The film's release date was rescheduled to January 2013, and the theater scene was replaced by a new sequence in a different setting.

In the wake of the shooting, DC Comics delayed the release of Batman Incorporated #3, which includes a scene in which a female Leviathan agent brandishes a handgun in a classroom full of children while disguised as a schoolteacher. Warner Bros. Animation reportedly edited the Cartoon Network series Beware the Batman to make the firearms look less realistic.

Hans Zimmer, who composed the soundtrack for The Dark Knight Rises, recorded a choral song entitled "Aurora" in honor of the victims. The song was sold for donations that went to a fund for the victims.

Cinemark agreed to pay any funeral expenses incurred by the deceased victims' families not covered by the Crime Victims' Compensation Fund.  Cinemark closed the entire Century Aurora 16 multiplex in the wake of the shooting but reopened January 17, 2013, with a 40-minute ceremony led by Aurora Mayor Steve Hogan, followed by a showing of The Hobbit: An Unexpected Journey. As of 2020, Cinemark Theatres has not released any photographs or video evidence.

Soon after the shooting, police departments and cinemas across the United States and around the world increased security for fear of copycat incidents. In New York City, police officers were deployed to theaters screening the new film.

The National Association of Theatre Owners distributed checklists from the U.S. Department of Homeland Security to its members and said in a July 21 statement that members were "working closely with local law enforcement agencies and reviewing security procedures". AMC Theatres announced it would "not allow any guests into our theatres in costumes that make other guests feel uncomfortable and we will not permit face-covering masks or fake weapons inside our buildings". Security Director News raised the possibility in a July 23 article that "the massacre could be a Virginia Tech for movie theaters, causing security to become a bigger part of the conversation and more stringent security procedures to be adopted at theaters across the country."

Civil litigation

Cinemark Theaters
Three victims sued Cinemark Theatres in the U.S. District Court for the District of Colorado on September 21, 2012, for the company's alleged negligence in failing to provide adequate safety and security measures.  Their attorneys released the statement "Readily available security procedures, security equipment and security personnel would likely have prevented or deterred the gunman from accomplishing his planned assault on the theater's patrons."

In response, Cinemark's representation filed a motion to dismiss on September 27, 2012, on the grounds that there was no liability under Colorado law for failure to prevent an unforeseeable criminal act. Cinemark's motion quoted extensively from the landmark California appellate opinion that held McDonald's had no duty of care to prevent the 1984 San Ysidro McDonald's massacre.  On October 30, 2012, the court hearing the criminal case against Holmes denied a motion by some of the survivors that would have let them access sealed evidence for review in their civil action against the theater chain. On January 24, 2013, U.S. Magistrate Judge Michael Hegarty issued a recommendation that most of the claims be thrown out, as they were not allowable under Colorado law. He also said claims alleging violations of the Colorado Premises Liability Act could proceed.

Judge R. Brooke Jackson stated that for theaters today, "One might reasonably believe that a mass shooting incident in a theater was likely enough (that is, not just a possibility) to be a foreseeable next step in the history of such acts by deranged individuals".  Attorney Christina Habas, who represents several theater victims, has said: "We essentially don't have a single photograph, a single piece of evidence that we can show to a jury". In June 2016, a federal judge dismissed the last claims in the lawsuit.

In a separate lawsuit in state court, Cinemark was sued by families of the victims, who alleged the theater should have taken greater measures to prevent such a shooting. In May 2016, after years of legal debate, a jury took three hours to deliver a unanimous verdict that the theater chain was not liable to any degree for the tragedy that transpired. The judge allowed Cinemark Theatres to submit a bill of costs to the plaintiffs to recover expenses due to the litigation, as Colorado state law allows for prevailing parties. In September 2016, Cinemark dropped all claims for reimbursement of legal fees.

University of Colorado
On January 14, 2013, Chantel Blunk, estranged wife and widow of victim Jonathan Blunk, filed a lawsuit against the University of Colorado in federal court. She alleged that a school psychiatrist could have prevented the slaughter by having Holmes detained after he admitted he "fantasized about killing a lot of people". This type of lawsuit had been anticipated in an August 2012 article co-authored by bioethicist Arthur Caplan which discussed the applicability of the landmark California Supreme Court decision in Tarasoff v. Regents of the University of California (1976) to the facts of the Aurora shooting.

Community center
A grassroots community center, Aurora Strong Resilience Center, was established by community leaders, elected officials, and mental health professionals, as a response to the shooting. The center offers therapy for people who experienced traumatic stress from the theater shooting, and also people who were victims of other crimes and refugees who experienced a traumatic event in their country of origin before coming to the U.S.

Aftermath

Sale of guns and gun control debate
Colorado gun sales spiked after the shooting, with the number of background checks for people seeking to purchase a firearm in the state increasing to 2,887, up 43% from the previous week. Gun sales in Washington, Florida, California, and Georgia also increased. The shooting reignited the political debate on gun control, with one issue being the "easy access" Holmes had to semi-automatic rifles and high-capacity magazines, which were banned federally from 1994 to 2004. The results of a survey released on July 30, 2012, by the Pew Research Center suggested the incident did not change Americans' views on the issue.

Campaign against media coverage
In 2015, a campaign titled "No Notoriety" was started by the parents of Alexander Teves, who died in the shooting. According to Teves' father, the campaign's incentive is to encourage media outlets to limit the usage of the suspect's name and photos when reporting about the Aurora shooting, as well as other mass shootings that receive national media coverage. In an interview on CNN, Teves' parents said they and the relatives of other victims believe the mass media coverage of Holmes' name and photo may inspire others to commit mass shootings for notoriety.

Theater 
The Century 16 theater where the shooting occurred was rebranded as the Century Aurora theater by its parent company Cinemark Theatres. Despite heavy criticism from families and loved ones of victims, the theater was not demolished and reopened to the public after cleaning and renovation on January 25, 2013, nearly 6 months after the shooting. The reopening ceremony, which was boycotted by opponents of the theater's reopening, included a memorial service and a screening of The Hobbit: An Unexpected Journey. Theater room nine, where the actual shooting occurred, was combined with an adjoining room into a new XD theater room.

Memorial
It consists of a park-like dell with 83 abstract birds, one for each victim. Thirteen of the birds, with translucent wings, are on a center column and represent the twelve dead and the unborn child. The memorial, titled "Ascentiate," was designed by artist Douwe Blumberg.

See also

 1989 Harlem Nights movie theater shooting – Detroit suburban theater shooting that occurred simultaneous to a shooting scene in the film
 2015 Lafayette shooting – theater shooting in Lafayette, Louisiana, that occurred during the screening of the film Trainwreck
 Dark Night, a 2016 film about the shooting
 Gun laws in Colorado
 Gun law in the United States
 Gun violence in the United States
 Mass shootings in the United States
 List of rampage killers in the United States

References

External links

Maps of crime scene
 Map of theater, parking lot, and diagram of the charges at The Washington Post
 Map of theater, suspect's apartment, and hospitals at The Denver Post
 Map and photographs of crime scene at The New York Times
      
Photos
 "Aurora Colorado theater shooting: The Big Picture", The Boston Globe. July 23, 2012.

2012 active shooter incidents in the United States
2012 in Colorado
2012 mass shootings in the United States
2012 murders in the United States
21st-century mass murder in the United States
Attacks in the United States in 2012
Attacks on buildings and structures in the United States
Attacks on cinemas
Crime in Colorado
Incidents of violence against girls
Deaths by firearm in Colorado
History of Aurora, Colorado
July 2012 crimes in the United States
July 2012 events in the United States
Mass murder in 2012
Mass murder in Colorado
Mass murder in the United States
Mass shootings in Colorado
Mass shootings in the United States
Massacres in the United States
The Dark Knight Trilogy